John Gough was a Canadian football player who played for the Edmonton Eskimos. He played college football at the University of Oklahoma.

References

1920s births
Possibly living people
Edmonton Elks players
Oklahoma Sooners football players